is a former Japanese football player.

Playing career
Kohei Yoshioka played for SC Sagamihara, Grulla Morioka and Fujieda MYFC from 2008 to 2015.

References

External links

1985 births
Living people
Takushoku University alumni
Association football people from Tokyo
Japanese footballers
J3 League players
SC Sagamihara players
Iwate Grulla Morioka players
Fujieda MYFC players
Association football midfielders
21st-century Japanese people